Facundo Nahuel Tallarico (born 21 October 1999) is an Argentine professional footballer who plays as a centre-back for Fénix de Pilar, on loan from Chacarita Juniors.

Career
Tallarico began his career with Chacarita Juniors in Primera B Nacional. The 2018–19 season saw Tallarico make the move into their senior squad, appearing on the substitutes bench for a draw away to Nueva Chicago on 17 March 2019; though he wasn't substituted on by manager Patricio Pisano. His debut did, however, arrive a week later on 23 March as he played the full duration of a home match versus Guillermo Brown. In January 2022, Tallarico joined Fénix de Pilar on a one-year loan deal.

Career statistics
.

References

External links

1999 births
Living people
Place of birth missing (living people)
Argentine footballers
Association football defenders
Primera Nacional players
Chacarita Juniors footballers
Club Atlético Fénix players